Pat Presley is a Canadian retired ice hockey defenseman who was a 2-time All-American for St. Lawrence.

Career
After finishing his junior career in the Quebec-area, Presley was able to earn an athletic scholarship to St. Lawrence, near his home town of Ottawa. After a year with the freshman team Presley became an instant hit not only for the Saints, but for all of college hockey. He became one of the select few players to earn First Team All-American honors in his first season of play despite the Larries performing less impressively than they had in recent seasons. In his junior season the team posted its worst season since World War II, winning just ten games and finishing last in the Tri-State League.

For his final season the team had a resurgence with Presley leading the defensive corps. He was again a First Team All-American, the first player in program history to achieve that feat, and pushed the Saints to an undefeated record in their conference. St. Lawrence returned to the tournament for the first time in three years and they met North Dakota in the semifinal. From the drop of the puck the Fighting Sioux dominated the Larries and built a 3-goal lead going into the third period. just when it looked like the Saints would be swept off the ice the team came alive and scored three times to tie the game and force overtime. Less than 5 minutes into the session, however, Presley's Saints were felled by a shot from the point that deflected in off of the crossbar. In the consolation game the Larries built three separate leads, only for Boston College to tie the game each time. Overtime was again required and while the game continued into a 5th frame, the result for St. Lawrence was the same as their previous game.

After his college career ended, Presley joined the new IHL team, the Milwaukee Falcons. Presley played one year for the team before retiring.

Presley was also a pitcher for the St. Lawrence baseball team and in 1987 he was inducted into the St. Lawrence Athletic Hall of Fame in both sports.

Statistics

Regular season and playoffs

Awards and honors

References

External links

1935 births
Canadian ice hockey defencemen
St. Lawrence Saints men's ice hockey players
Milwaukee Falcons players
Ice hockey people from Ottawa
AHCA Division I men's ice hockey All-Americans
Living people